The resistive ballooning mode (RBM) is an instability occurring in magnetized plasmas, particularly in magnetic confinement devices such as tokamaks, when the pressure gradient is opposite to the effective gravity created by a magnetic field.

Linear growth rate
The linear growth rate  of the RBM instability is given as

where  is the pressure gradient   is the effective gravity produced by a non-homogeneous magnetic field, R0 is the major radius of the device, Lp is a characteristic length of the pressure gradient, and cs is the plasma sound speed.

Similarity with the Rayleigh–Taylor instability

The RBM instability is similar to the Rayleigh–Taylor instability (RT), with Earth gravity  replaced by the effective gravity , except that for the RT instability,  acts on the mass density  of the fluid, whereas for the RBM instability,  acts on the pressure  of the plasma.

Plasma instabilities
Stability theory
Tokamaks